Alfred Shaw (1842–1907) was a British cricketer.

Alfred Shaw may also refer to:

Alfred P. Shaw (1895–?), American architect
Al Shaw (catcher) (Alfred Shaw, 1873–1958), American baseball player
Alf Shaw, racing driver, 1960 Grand Prix motorcycle racing season
Alfred Shaw (motorcyclist); see Rider deaths in motorcycle racing
Alfred Shaw (painter); see Mary Shaw (contralto)

See also
Al Shaw (disambiguation)
Fred Shaw (disambiguation)